António Chainho (born Santiago do Cacém, 1938) is a Portuguese fado guitarist. He has worked with many of the great names in fado music, like Hermínia Silva, Carlos do Carmo and José Afonso, and world music, like Paco de Lucía. He has also recorded and toured extensively with the Lisbon-based São Toméan singer Marta Dias.

In 1998, Chainho contributed "Fado Da Adiça" and "Interlude: Variações Em Mi Menor" to the AIDS benefit compilation album Onda Sonora: Red Hot + Lisbon produced by the Red Hot Organization.

Discography (incomplete)

 1980 - Guitarra Portuguesa
 1996 - António Chainho with the London Philharmonic Orchestra
 1998 - A Guitarra e Outras Mulheres
 2000 - Lisboa-Rio
 2003 - António Chainho E Marta Dias - Ao Vivo No Ccb (live at the Cultural Centre of Belém Label: Movieplay
 2010 - Lisgoa''

References

External links
António Chainho website

1938 births
Living people
Portuguese fado guitarists
Portuguese session musicians
20th-century Portuguese musicians
20th-century Portuguese male musicians
21st-century Portuguese musicians
Commanders of the Order of Prince Henry